Szirtes is a Hungarian surname. It is a Hungarian name of Strihovce, Slovakia. Notable people with the surname include:

Ádám Szirtes (1925–1989), Hungarian actor
George Szirtes (born 1948), Hungarian-British poet and translator

Hungarian-language surnames